Daviesia speciosa is a species of flowering plant in the family Fabaceae and is endemic to the south-west of Western Australia. It is a low, erect, spindly, glabrous shrub with needle-shaped phyllodes almost indistinguishable from the branchlets, and red flowers.

Description
Flowering occurs in April and May.

Taxonomy
Daviesia speciosa was first formally described in 1995 by Michael Crisp in Australian Systematic Botany from specimens collected in 1958 by Charles Chapman near Eneabba. The specific epithet (speciosa) means "showy".

Distribution and habitat
This daviesia grows in heath between Eneabba and Mingenew in the Avon Wheatbelt and Geraldton Sandplains biogeographic regions of south-western Western Australia.

Conservation status
Daviesia speciosa is classified as "Threatened" by the Western Australian Government Department of Biodiversity, Conservation and Attractions, meaning that it is in danger of extinction.

References

speciosa
Taxa named by Michael Crisp
Plants described in 1995
Flora of Western Australia